Bode Abiodun (born 10 September 1980) is a Nigerian table tennis player. He competed at the 2016 Summer Olympics as part of the Nigerian team, in the men's team event.

Tennis

References

1980 births
Living people
Nigerian male table tennis players
Olympic table tennis players of Nigeria
Table tennis players at the 2016 Summer Olympics
Commonwealth Games medallists in table tennis
Commonwealth Games bronze medallists for Nigeria
Table tennis players at the 2018 Commonwealth Games
African Games medalists in table tennis
20th-century Nigerian people
21st-century Nigerian people
Competitors at the 2019 African Games
African Games bronze medalists for Nigeria
Medallists at the 2018 Commonwealth Games